The Catoptinae are a subfamily of the family Cossidae (carpenter or goat moths).

Genera
 Catopta Staudinger, 1899
 Chiangmaiana Kemal & Koçak, 2005 objective replacement name Cesa, Miscellaneous papers, 91/92: 12. [misdating as: "Kemal & Koçak, 2007" (Yakovlev & Saldaitis, 2007) Eversmannia, 11–12: 12 ; misdating as: "Kemal & Koçak, 2006" (Yakovlev, 2009) Zoologicheskii Zhurnal, 88 (10): 1207, 1211.]  ( ≡ Nirvana Yakovlev, 2004 nom. invalid.(preoc.name) non Stål, 1859 nec Kirkaldy, 1900 nec Yakovlev, 2007 nec Tsukuda & Nishiyama, 1979);( ≡ Nirrvanna Yakovlev, 2007 nom. invalid.( junior object. syn.), objective replacement name (mistaken repl.n.) non Stål, 1859 nec Kirkaldy, 1900 nec Tsukuda & Nishiyama, 1979 )

References

 , 1937: Zwei neue Cossidae aus Persien. Mitteilungen der Münchner Entomologischen Gesellschaft 27: 49–51. Full article: .
 , 2005. Nomenclatural notes on various taxa of the Moths (Lepidoptera). — Centre for Entomological Studies Ankara, Miscellaneous Papers, 91/92: 11–14. 
 , 2009. Catoptinae subfam. n., a new subfamily of carpenter-moths (Lepidoptera: Cossidae). Entomological Review 89 (8): 927–932.
 , 2007.  Little known species of Palaearctic and Oriental Cossidae (Lepidoptera). II. Chiangmaiana qinlingensis Hua, Chou, Fang & Chen, 1990. Eversmannia, 11–12: 12–13; Pl.[I]: map2, f.2
 , 2009: The Carpenter Moths (Lepidoptera:Cossidae) of Vietnam. Entomofauna Supplement 16: 11–32.

External links
Natural History Museum Lepidoptera generic names catalog

 
Cossidae
Moth subfamilies